Sajeed A is a Mumbai-based television producer, filmmaker and screenwriter, in addition to being a mastermind behind many hit series on MTV.

MTV Girls Night Out, India's first horror reality show which was directed by him won the Best Reality Show in Asian Television Awards, Singapore, 2011.

His directorial debut in films was the award-winning short film Buddha Never Smiled and his full length Malayalam feature Goodbye December is slated for 2012 release.

Career 

Sajeed A. began his career with MTV India as a trainee producer and went on to associate and produce/direct some of the most popular shows and promos on MTV – Fully Faltoo, Most Wanted, LoveLine, VJ Profiles, Eat This, Dance Crew and directed heavy duty outdoor concerts like MTV Music Summit and has associated with concerts like Deep Purple, Bryan Adams, MC Hammer etc. and Events like Style Awards, MTV Immies and the smash hit humour reality MTV Bakra. The Bakra association was pretty long and his partnership with funny man Cyrus Broacha went on for a decade.

His last directorial outing for TV was MTV Girls Night Out produced by Miditech for MTV India and it went on to win Best Reality Show at the Asian Television Awards, Singapore, 2011. It also won the Indian Television Academy award in the Best Thriller category. MTV Girls Night Out was Indian television's first foray into the horror reality genre.

Sajeed A. was also the creative director for the show MTV LoudLess, the Indian adaptation of the popular Japanese game show Silent Library.

He has directed many music videos for various artists like Blaaze – a 26/11 initiative called "Stand up Together, Unite Together" (by BlaaZe and Prince Ali) and bands like Fuzon (Unplugged), Sessions/Unplugged for Indian Idol, Lucky Ali and for the
rockband Jigsaw Puzzle – The song from their first album 'Revelation' was nominated as the best music video shot and worked on using Digital technology at the IV Fest.

He is also involved with Mousiqui the musical from A&G Partners and Shafdani Entertainment as a Creative Director.

His directorial debut in films was the short film Buddha Never Smiled which went around internationally and got him the India Vision Best Debut Director (Shorts) award. After a decade of association with MTV (India) he moved into features and he marks his debut with a Malayalam feature Goodbye December . The film marks the feature debut of the Shillong Chamber Choir from North East India as they are composing the songs and background score for the film. The art realisation of the film is by Sukant Panigrahy & Helen Jones of Dev D fame. The lead cast and rest of the casting details are not revealed yet.

Two songs from the Bollywood movie Ghanchakkar – "Lazy Lad" and "Jholu Ram" which saw the come back of Altaf Raja was directed by Sajeed.A. "Lazy Lad" was innovative with its visual feel with striking colours, sets and props. The songs were shot by Polly Morgan in Mumbai.

FilmographyBuddha Never Smiled (Short film)Goodbye December (Malayalam feature film)

Awards
 Buddha Never Smiled– India Vision Best Debut Director (Shorts)
 MTV Girls Night Out'' – Best Reality Show, Asian Television Awards, Singapore, 2011, Best Thriller 2011, Indian Television Academy Award '''
 Cinematography (Merit) Indian Documentary Producers Association, 2011

References

External links
 Official website

Year of birth missing (living people)
Living people
Indian television producers
Indian male screenwriters
Malayalam film directors
Screenwriters from Mumbai